Sofignano is an Italian village and frazione belonging to the municipality of Vaiano, in the Province of Prato, Tuscany.

Geography

Overview
The village of Sofignano is 2,33 kilometers from Vaiano.

It belongs Vaiano municipality together with Fabio (2,28 km), Faltugnano (2,91 km), La Briglia (1,51 km), La Cartaia (2,57 km), La Tignamica (0,47 km), Le Fornaci (3,10 km), Schignano (2,83 km)

Sofignano is spread on the mid side of the western face of the Calvana Hill and it  consists of various localities:

Localities
Sofignano consists of several courtyards and small villages:
Boana
Nucleus of a few houses including a school and some houses.

Ca' dei Landi
Medieval group of houses and a church now accessible only by foot. There are stems and religious relics now left into ruin.

Casanera
Fortified mansion dated 1200 now being renovated, it is the southernmost building in Sofignano.

Collisassi
Village perched on the mountain with several refurbished villas.

Colombaia
Ancient buildings and farmhouses now surrounded by few modern houses.

Docciola
Between Le Fornaci and the Church the Le Fornaci, it is a group of single houses with stables and a few nearby cottages.

Fattoria delle Mura
Now completely renewed, this big villa and the many houses around it were built ond a medieval tower. the tower, now completely lost, was part of a triangle of towers made by this one, the San Gaudenzio Tower (then included into the villa) and the Torre del Melograno, recently re-discovered and representing the main medieval manufact in Sofignano.  .

L'Olmo
Group of houses mostly farms.

La Lastruccia
Other houses perched on a hill.

Il Baldino
At Collisassi Il Baldino and consists of dwellings.

Sofignano (village)
The proper village that names the area. Here is the parish of Santi Vito e Modesto in Sofignano and the cemetery.

Le Fornaci
It is the most populated area, surrounding an ancient village where bricks were produced into a fornax, naming the place (Fornace = fornax). It started expanding around the old part in the 1980s and it is now considered by many the actual center of Sofignano.

Gallery

See also
Santi Vito e Modesto in Sofignano

References

External links

 Hiking in Sofignano

Frazioni of the Province of Prato